The 1880 Derby by-election was held when the incumbent Liberal MP Samuel Plimsoll resigned to find a seat for the recently unseated Home Secretary William Vernon Harcourt.

The Liberals had formed a government after winning the 1880 general election and Harcourt, a well known radical and talented debater, had been offered the job of Home Secretary.  Under the law at the time he had to resign his seat and seek re-election.  In a close fought by-election Harcourt lost his Oxford seat.

Samuel Plimsoll immediately resigned and Harcourt was unopposed in the subsequent by-election.

References

By-elections to the Parliament of the United Kingdom in Derbyshire constituencies
Unopposed by-elections to the Parliament of the United Kingdom in English constituencies
1880 elections in the United Kingdom
1880 in England
19th century in Derbyshire